Charles Fletcher Twemlow (1901–1976) was an English footballer who played in the Football League for Stoke. His brother Billy was also a footballer.

Career
Twemlow was born in Macclesfield and played for Macclesfield before joining Stoke in 1921. He played one match in the Football League which came in a 4–2 victory at Derby County during the 1921–22 season, Twemlow also scored in this match. He was released soon after and re-joined Macclesfield where he played alongside his brother. He spent the next eight years at the Moss Rose making a further 179 appearances for the Silkmen.

Career statistics
Source:

References

English footballers
Stoke City F.C. players
English Football League players
1901 births
1976 deaths
Macclesfield Town F.C. players
Association football wing halves